Cicadetta cantilatrix is a cicada found in France, Poland, Germany, Switzerland, Austria, Slovenia, North Macedonia, and Montenegro. The calling song from this species consists of two phrases with different echemes.

References

Fauna of Austria
Fauna of France
Insects described in 2007
Cicadettini